Norman Turnbull (15 June 1894 – 19 July 1977) was an Australian rules footballer who played for St Kilda Football Club and Richmond Football Club in the VFL and horse trainer in both Melbourne and Sydney.

After growing up in Richmond, Turnbull commenced his senior football career with St Kilda in 1914, making eight appearances in his first season. He was reported as having enlisted in late 1915 although there are no official service records under his name in the official archives.

In 1918, Turnbull returned to senior football, playing the first eight rounds before being excluded from the team by the St Kilda committee “in the best interests of the team, owing to his play”. He was reinstated late in the 1920 season and played two more games for St Kilda before moving to Richmond for the 1921 VFL season. In his first game against his old club he was reported for striking Bill Woodcock and suspended for four matches, but returned to the team, kicking the winning goal in the Grand Final as Richmond won their second VFL premiership.

After football Turnbull became a successful horse trainer, later moving to Sydney.

References

External links

St Kilda Football Club players
Richmond Football Club players
Richmond Football Club Premiership players
Australian rules footballers from Victoria (Australia)
Australian horse trainers
1894 births
1977 deaths
One-time VFL/AFL Premiership players